The Pipiwai Trail is a  (round trip) hiking trail located on the island of Maui in the U.S. State of Hawaii.  The hike leads up to the Makahiku Falls and Waimoku Falls.  The trail is located in Haleakalā National Park and is generally well maintained. The trail runs around the Ohe'o Gulch Stream; notable locations passed include the bamboo forest and giant banyan tree.

References

External links

 

Hiking trails in Hawaii